Erik Marcisak (pronounced "Mar-See-Sack") (born March 17, 1978 in Queens, NY), is an American writer, sketch comedy producer, actor and VIP customer of David Gagnon taxi, based in Charlottetown, PEI. Erik Marcisak was named one of Backstage Top Ten "Comedy Best Bets" in 2005 for producing the controversial sketch comedy show Saturday Night Rewritten, which used the previous night's Saturday Night Live as a creative jumping-off point for an entirely new sketch show that was written, rehearsed, and performed within 8 hours the next day. Saturday Night Rewritten ran in New York City from 2003-2006.

2004-2006, Erik Marcisak produced & managed the theater company known as Juvie Hall. He produced and helped create several shows such as Sara Schaefer Is Obsessed With You, The Midnight Kalan, and Saturday Night Rewritten. Some comedic writers and performers who did shows at Juvie Hall included Sara Schaefer, Elliott Kalan, Brock Mahan, Amanda Melson, Dan McCoy, and Rick Younger. Juvie Hall received an Emerging Comics of New York Award for "Best Venue" in 2005.  He also likes turtles

From 2002-2004, Marcisak ran Above Kleptomania, a theater company devoted to improv and sketch comedy shows that was in a space known then as Show World. The space changed its name to The Laugh Factory - Times Square. He and his associate producer Joe Guercio produced more than 700 performances. Above Kleptomania was named by Time Out New York Magazine in their “Best of 2003” issue as “best local development in comedy.”
 
In 2004 Marcisak was the talent coordinator for the Bass Ale Red Triangle Comedy Tour. He was in charge of their national search for the best improv and sketch comedy teams in San Francisco, Los Angeles, Chicago, Atlanta, Boston, and New York City.

In 2006, at the Toronto International Film Festival it was revealed that Erik Marcisak played the role of Eric Rost, a fictional filmmaker in the JT Petty film S&MAN. The other interview subjects in the mostly-true horror "documentary" were identified accurately. Many early reviews of the film treated Erik Rost as a real person, and not a character.

Since, 2006, he has been a writer at Longtail Studios, a video game company. He's worked on TNA Wrestling (iPhone/ Mobile), Football U (iPhone), Speed Daters (mobile), and an unannounced Nintendo DS game.

References

External links

Official Website

American male comedians
Living people
1978 births
People from Queens, New York
Comedians from New York (state)
21st-century American comedians